Emanuel Forchhammer (12 March 1851 - April 26, 1890) was a Swiss indologist, pāli specialist, orientalist and the first professor of Pali in Rangoon College. He was a pioneer in Burmese Archaeology.

Family
Forchhammer was born on 12 March 1851 in Switzerland. He was the youngest son of Christian Gottlieb F. (1814–1859), a Lutheran minister, and Elisabeth Schlegel (1824–1891). He had a brother, Theophil F., who was the church musician.

Career
Forchhammer studied medicine in New York, where he also obtained a doctorate and became an assistant at a hospital. He then lived for several years among the native Americans of the West to learn their language. In 1875, he returned to Europe, where he learned Armenian in the Armenian monastery of San Lazzaro near Venice and until 1878, studied oriental philology in Leipzig. In 1878, he was offered two academic positions. He rejected the offer of the Emperor of Brazil to survey Indian languages but he accepted the chair of Pāli at Rangoon College, becoming the country's first professor in Pali. He scoured the libraries of Buddhist monasteries with tireless zeal to collect manuscripts. In 1882, he became an Archaeological Inspector for British Burma, engaging in excavations and the decipherment of ancient inscriptions in Pāli, Mon, and Burmese.

Forchhammer studied the various languages of Burma and carried out, excavations and archaeological investigations, particularly in the ancient temple cities of Arakan and Pagan. There are two main inscriptions in Burma today. One exists on the platform of the Myazedi Pagoda, in the village of Myinkaba (south of Bagan), in Mandalay Division. The other was discovered by Forchhammer in 1886–1887 and is currently on display at the Bagan Archaeological Museum. The Myazedi inscription is recognised as Memory of the World Register by UNESCO.

He published a systematic account of the ancient manuscripts collected by him in Burma (1882), Notes on the Early History and Geography of British Burma (1883–84), Sources and Development of Burmese Law (1885), a contribution to Jardine's Notes on Buddhist Law (1882–83) and treatises on the Burmese languages in the "Indian Antiquary". He has left behind much that remains unpublished.

References

Citations

General 
Forchhammer, Emanuel in Salmonsen's Conversation Lexicon (2nd edition, 1919)

External links
Dictionary of Indian Biography  by Charles Edward Buckland

Swiss orientalists
Swiss Indologists
1851 births
1890 deaths